No. 270 Squadron RAF was a Royal Air Force squadron that operated both in the First and Second World Wars mainly as an anti-shipping and anti-submarine squadron.

First World War
No. 270 Squadron was formed in April 1919 from three flights (354, 355 and 356) of the Royal Naval Air Service based at Alexandria with floatplanes and flying boats. The main role was coastal reconnaissance which it continued to do until it was disbanded on 15 September 1919 when it was absorbed into 269 Squadron.

Second World War
The squadron was re-formed on 12 November 1942 at RAF Jui, in Sierra Leone, with the Consolidated Catalina flying boat. It flew sorties into the mid-Atlantic on anti-submarine patrols, sinking a U-boat in January 1943. It was also tasked with finding ships trying to break the blockade on Vichy France ports. The squadron had detachments at RAF Bathurst, Gambia, and Fisherman's Lake, Liberia.

In July 1943 the squadron moved to Lagos, Nigeria to be based at RAF Apapa, at the end of that year it re-equipped with the four-engined Short Sunderland. The squadron operated detachments at RAF Jui, Abidjan and Libreville. The squadron was disbanded, after the war in the Atlantic had ended, on 30 June 1945 at Apapa, Nigeria.

Aircraft operated

References

Notes

Bibliography

  
 Jefford, C.G. RAF Squadrons, a Comprehensive Record of the Movement and Equipment of all RAF Squadrons and their Antecedents since 1912. Shrewsbury, Shropshire, UK: Airlife Publishing, 1988. 
 Jefford, C.G. RAF Squadrons, a Comprehensive Record of the Movement and Equipment of all RAF Squadrons and their Antecedents since 1912. Shrewsbury, Shropshire, UK: Airlife Publishing, 2001. .

External links
 No 266 – 270 Squadron Histories

270